Baculovirus gene transfer into Mammalian cells, known from scientific research articles as BacMam, is the use of baculovirus to deliver genes to mammalian cells. Baculoviruses are insect cell viruses that can be modified to express proteins in mammalian cells. The unmodified baculovirus is able to enter those cells, however its genes are not expressed unless a mammalian recognizable promoter is incorporated upstream of a gene of interest. Both unmodified baculovirus and its modified counterpart are unable to replicate in humans and are thus non-infectious.

Invented by Dr. Frederick M. Boyce, BacMam is a baculovirus-mediated gene transfer technique that has gained widespread use because of advantages when compared to other transfection methods, (for reviews see, Kost, T.A. et al,). In addition, BacMam has been found to have inherent flexibility over stable cell lines, which has contributed to its adoption as a standard gene transfer technique.

General Properties

The BacMam gene delivery technology is a transient expression system, which facilitates expression of toxic gene products. It has a broad range of transduction including many primary cell types and stem cells. The baculoviral genome has a large capacity for foreign gene insert with up to 38 kb have been tried successfully. Simultaneous delivery of multiple genes to the same cell is feasible. There is little to no microscopically observable cytopathic effects of BacMam particles on mammalian cells. The level of gene expression can be adjusted by viral dose or chemical additions using histone deacetylase inhibitors. Transduction of cells is performed by liquid only addition and therefore BacMam is amenable to automated methods. Finally viruses are stable when stored at 4 °C in the dark for long periods of time.

Biosafety Considerations

Baculoviruses are Risk Group 1 agents that have been widely used for over 25 years for insect cell protein production applications. Baculoviruses are produced in insect cells and incapable of replicating in mammalian cells and are not known to cause disease in healthy human adults. Furthermore, BacMam viruses are inactivated by human complement, which reduces risk to researchers. Lastly, viruses used in the laboratory cannot replicate in insects so there is no environmental threat from these particles accidentally being released into the environment.

Viral Entry

Studies on baculovirus entry into human hepatocellular carcinoma cells suggest that BacMam enters mammalian cells via clathrin-mediated endocytosis and possibly via macropinocytosis. Further studies have suggested that  caveolae are somehow involved in baculovirus entry in mammalian cells.

Host Cell Response

To be effective, a gene delivery technology must not interfere with normal cellular function. Cytotoxicity assays and transcriptome analyses on a human HEK cell line (HEK293) have revealed that baculovirus transduction is not cytotoxic and does not induce differential transcriptional responses. Similarly, infected Schwann cells retain their characteristic morphological and molecular phenotype and are capable of differentiating in vitro and express the P0 myelination marker. Using complementary DNA (cDNA) microarray technology to examine in vitro and in vivo global cellular gene expression profiles in the rat brain, cultured human astrocytes and human neuronal cells after viral transduction, host antiviral responses were observed. The related genes were mainly those associated with innate immunity, including several of the genes involved in Toll-like receptor signaling pathway and cytokine-cytokine receptor interaction.

 Bioproduction
 BacMam has been used to produce proteins in large quantities using HEK293 cells in a hollow fiber bioreactor system
 High Throughput Screening
 Pharmacology of G protein-coupled receptor is enabled with the use of BacMam technology in drug discovery applications
 Fluorescence Microscopy
 Organelle labeling reagents are commercially available BacMam particles for labeling organelles and other subcellular structures
 Single mitochondrion labeled with a mitochondrial targeted green fluorescent protein
 Receptor Activation/Pathway Analysis
 Characterization of serotonin receptor activation via a BacMam delivered GFP fusion to a kinase substrate
 Structural Biology
 BacMam system has been used to produce soluble and membrane glycoproteins for structural studies

See also
 Baculovirus

References

External links
 The BacMam System

Applied genetics